Jan Brzeźny (born 11 June 1951) is a retired Polish cyclist. He competed at the 1976 Summer Olympics in the individual road race and finished in 30th place. He won the Tour of Britain in 1978 and Tour de Pologne in 1978 and 1981. He finished second in the Tour de Pologne in 1976.

He is married to Teresa Brzeźna; they have a daughter Gabriela and two sons, Tomasz and Michael. They live in Wrocław.

References

External links

1951 births
Living people
Cyclists at the 1976 Summer Olympics
Olympic cyclists of Poland
Polish male cyclists
People from Dzierżoniów County
Sportspeople from Lower Silesian Voivodeship